Upon the Sweeping Flood and Other Stories is a collection of short stories written by Joyce Carol Oates. It was published in 1966 - three years after By the North Gate - by Vanguard Press.

Joanne V. Creighton points out both the differences and the similarities between the two volumes:

Less often set in Eden County than the stories in By the North Gate, those in Upon the Sweeping Flood embody some of the same themes: the gropings of inarticulate people for order and meaning and the discovery of hidden, unlovely depth of passion or of emptiness within one's self. The emphasis here, however, is more focused on the interrelationships among people, be they familial, emotional, or social. Oates exhibits here the beginning of her intense preoccupation with both the tenacious bands of the family and the mysterious emotions of love.

Stories 

 "Dying"
 "The Man That Turned into a Statue"
 "The Death of Mrs. Sheer"
 "What Death with Love Should Have to Do"
 "At the Seminary"
 "Norman and the Killer"
 "Archways"
 "The Survival of Childhood"
 "First Views of the Enemy"
 "Stigmata"
 "Upon the Sweeping Flood"

References 

1966 short story collections
Short story collections by Joyce Carol Oates
Vanguard Press books